Rajpal Singh Saini is a politician from Rashtriya Lok Dal and former Member of the Parliament of India representing Uttar Pradesh in the Rajya Sabha, the upper house of the Indian Parliament.

Early life and education
Rajpal Saini was born in Luhsana Muzaffarnagar, Uttar Pradesh in 1953. He holds a BSc. degree from CCS  University. Prior to joining politics, he was an agriculturist by profession.

References

Living people
Bahujan Samaj Party politicians from Uttar Pradesh
Rajya Sabha members from Uttar Pradesh
1953 births
People from Muzaffarnagar district
Rashtriya Lok Dal politicians
Samajwadi Party politicians from Uttar Pradesh